Martins Creek is an unincorporated community in Cherokee County, in the U.S. state of North Carolina.

History
The community takes its name from nearby Martin Creek.

References

Unincorporated communities in North Carolina
Unincorporated communities in Cherokee County, North Carolina